The Royal Danish Nautical Charts Archive was a Danish Navy department, responsible for making accurate nautical charts for the Danish government, primary the Navy, for nearly 200 years. Its former building at Toldbodvej, now Esplanaden, was also the first home of the Danish Meteorological Institute. The building was used as an extension office for Maersk Group services, but is being renovated and will soon house the Maersk Foundation offices.

History

The Royal Danish Nautical Charts Archive was initiated by royal resolution of 25 October 1784, at the initiative of a naval captain, Poul Løvenørn, who would also become the first director of the department. It was originally located on Holmens Kanal, next to Holmen Church.

On 1 April 1973 the department, together with Lodsvæsenet (the pilot service), Fyrvæsenet (the lighthouse service) and Redningsvæsenet (the rescue service), was merged into Farvandsdirektoratet, in that process changing its name to Nautisk Afdeling and gaining a few more responsibilities. By royal resolution of 9 October 1987, the nautical chart production part was detached and combined with Geodætisk Institut and Matrikeldirektoratet to form Kort & Matrikelstyrelsen, where it today is a department called Søkortområdet.

According to resolution of 1816, nautical charts produced by Søkortarkivet has no copyright expiration date. They are permanently copyright protected by the Danish government. This order is still valid according to the Danish copyright law § 92.

Directors
 1784–1826 Poul de Løvenørn
 1826–1853 Christian Christopher Zahrtmann
 1853–1888 Hans Peter Rothe
 1889–1898 Carl Frederick Wandel
 1899–1909 Gustav Frederik Holm
 1909–1919 Christian Bloch
 1919–1933 H. O. Ravn

References 

Government agencies of Denmark
Royal Danish Navy
Hydrology organizations
Cartography by country
Maps of Scandinavia